The Special Suppressive Antiterrorist Unit (Eidiki Katastaltiki Antitromokratiki Monada, EKAM) is the police tactical unit of the Hellenic Police. It is the most distinguished part of the Hellenic Police. It was formed in 1978 when two police tactical units were created within the two police divisions that existed then (Hellenic Gendarmerie and the Cities Police), which were united into a single body in 1984, the Hellenic Police. In the beginning the Unit had only 150 men, but when Greece became the host country of the 2004 Summer Olympics their number increased to 200 after reassessing the needs for the magnitude of the event.

Training 
The EKAM force is based in Athens, but have several detachments spread throughout Greece's major cities. Each officer is a full-time member who must have at least five years on the force before being allowed to try out. Many receive training from the Greek Army's Ranger School before going on to the police counter-terrorism school.

The Special Suppressive Antiterrorist Unit of the Hellenic Police follows a three-month training program every year. For its training modern, purpose-built facilities are being used. Training can also take place in other locations such as buildings in urban or rural areas (inhabited or not), the Athens International Airport, planes of Olympic Airways, the Piraeus port infrastructure, the Hellenic Railroad system, the Athens Metro. Other places that have been decided as suitable to cover its training needs can also be used. The Unit is in constant cooperation with other Special Units abroad such as the FBI, SAS and ERU via the ATLAS Network.

Operations 
The Special Suppressive Antiterrorist Unit of the Hellenic Police, operates all around Greece and abroad whenever is deemed necessary. It has confronted challenges such as hostage situations and it has contributed in the arrests of many dangerous criminals. The EKAM played a key role in the dismantling of the November 17 and Revolutionary People's Struggle terrorist organizations. In March 2003, it confronted successfully an incident on a Turkish Aeroplane which was hijacked while it flew from Istanbul to Ankara (flight no. 160) and ended up at the Athens International Airport at the order of the hijacker. In a successful operation the Unit stormed the plane and arrested the hijacker by incapacitating him with a taser and releasing all hostages safely.

Duties 
 Hostage situation response
 High risk arrests
 High risk VIP's escort
 W.M.D (Weapons of mass destruction) (C.B.R.N) hostage situation, intrusion response
 Special antiterrorism operations and operations against organized crime in collaboration with the Hellenic Security Forces
 Rescue operations including physical disasters in cooperation with the Fire Brigade

Equipment

Pistols
Glock 21 .45 ACP
SIG Sauer P229 .357 SIG
FN Five-seven FN 5.7×28mm
Ruger GP100 .357 Magnum revolver
CZ75 9×19mm Parabellum

Submachine Guns
Heckler & Koch MP5 9×19mm Parabellum. Versions used: MP5A3, MP5A4, MP5A5, MP5SD, MP5k and MP5k2
Heckler & Koch UMP
FN Herstal P90 FN 5.7×28mm
FN Herstal Uzi 9×19mm Parabellum

Assault Rifles
Colt M16A4 5,56×45mm
Colt M16A2 5,56×45mm
Colt M4A1 Carbine  5,56×45mm
Heckler & Koch G3A3 7,62×51mm
Izhmash AK-47 7,62×39mm

Machine Guns
FN Herstal MAG 7,62×51mm

Shotguns
Remington 870
Benelli M4 Super 90
Molot Vepr-12

Sniper Rifles
Heckler & Koch G3SG/1 7,62×51mm with Carl Zeiss 10x42 scope
Accuracy International Arctic Warfare with both 7,62×51mm and .338 Lapua Magnum with mounted Schmidt and Bender 3-12x50 scopes
Knight's Armament Company SR-25 Stoner 7,62×51mm with mounted Leupold 3-12x50 scopes
Kefefs Version P is used 
All the above sniper rifles can also be equipped with a special nightvision device.

Trivia
Outside international conventions the Greek name for the unit is Special Suppressive Antiterrorist Unit. At the time of its creation in the late 1970s, counter-terrorist units were conceived to be the assault teams deployed as a last resort against hostage situations. Hence the "suppression" designation used as a euphemism indicating a terminal engagement against terrorists .

References 

Hellenic Police
Police tactical units
1978 establishments in Greece
ATLAS Network